The 2015–16 Northern Counties East Football League season was the 34th in the history of the Northern Counties East Football League, a football competition in England.

For the first time, a series of Division 1 play-offs will decide a third promotion winner to the Premier Division.

Premier Division

The Premier Division featured 18 clubs which competed in the previous season, along with four new clubs.
Clubs promoted from Division One:
Clipstone
Pontefract Collieries

Clubs relegated from the Northern Premier League:
Brigg Town
Rainworth Miners Welfare

League table

Results

Stadia and locations

Division One

Division One featured 19 clubs which competed in the previous season, along with three new clubs:
 Glasshoughton Welfare, relegated from the Premier Division
 Hull United, promoted from the Humber Premier League
 Westella & Willerby, promoted from the Central Midlands Football League

League table

Play-offs

Semi-finals

Final

Results

Stadia and locations

League Cup

The 2015–16 Northern Counties East Football League League Cup is the 34th season of the league cup competition of the Northern Counties East Football League.

First round

Second round

Third round

Fourth round

Fifth round

Semi-finals

Final
Played on 14 May 2016 at Garforth.

References

External links
 Northern Counties East Football League

2015-16
9